Doddle is a mobile app (available for iPhone and Android) that provides a mobile production guide to the video, film and audio production industries.  The application is available for download from the App Store and Doddle's website.

History
Doddle is a product founded by Mobile Imagination, LLC. in 2010, by Richard Kwiat and Jim Robertson. Doddle allows film, video and audio industry related professionals to search for vendors and freelancers throughout the U.S.

The Product
Doddle allows a user to select from different listings of their choice and communicate and collaborate with the listed entity.

Producers can create and distribute digital call sheets. The Doddle call sheets function can be created on your smartphone as well as on the doddle online platform. All call sheets will always remain synced together.

See also 

 Doodle Kids

References

External links
Doddle's official site

IOS software
Film production software
Android (operating system) software
Video production companies